Chadley Wenn (born ) is a South African rugby union player for the  in the Currie Cup and the Rugby Challenge. His regular position is hooker.

References

South African rugby union players
Living people
1993 births
People from Stellenbosch
Rugby union hookers
Boland Cavaliers players
Rugby union players from the Western Cape
Western Province (rugby union) players
Griffons (rugby union) players